Suurna is a village in Saaremaa Parish, Saare County, Estonia, on the island of Saaremaa. As of 2011 Census, the settlement's population was 27.

Before the administrative reform in 2017, the village was in Salme Parish.

See also
Salme River

References 

Villages in Saare County